Iraj Kiarostami (7 July 1963 – 6 August 2015) was an amateur boxer from Iran, who competed in the 1992 Summer Olympics in the Super heavyweight (+91 kg) division and lost in the first round to Jerry Nijman of the Netherlands. He is also an Asian Games bronze medalist.

References

External links
 

1963 births
2015 deaths
Iranian male boxers
Olympic boxers of Iran
Boxers at the 1992 Summer Olympics
Asian Games bronze medalists for Iran
Asian Games medalists in boxing
Boxers at the 1990 Asian Games
Medalists at the 1990 Asian Games
Super-heavyweight boxers
Sportspeople from Tehran
20th-century Iranian people